Pates is a surname. Notable people with the surname include:

Colin Pates (born 1961), retired English footballer
Richard Pates (born 1943), American bishop of the Roman Catholic Church

See also
Barangay Pates
Pate's Grammar School in Cheltenham, England, UK
Pates, North Carolina, a community in the United States
Pate (disambiguation)
Pâtés